John Yonge may refer to:

John Yonge (c. 1465–1516), English ecclesiastic and diplomatist
James Yonge (translator) (fl. 1406–1438),  or John Yonge, Anglo-Irish translator, author, and civil servant
Sir John Yonge, 1st Baronet (1603–1663), merchant and Member of Parliament for several Devon seats
John Yonge Akerman (1806–1873), English antiquarian

See also
John Young (disambiguation)